Steve Martin is a motorcycle road racer from Australia. He currently resides in Melbourne, Australia. He is  the 2009 World Endurance Champion for YART (Yamaha Austria Racing Team), but is a veteran of the World Superbike Championship, and former champion of the Australian series.

After success in trials, he started racing in his home Superbike Championship in 1990, initially on a factory Suzuki. Years on private bikes followed, but he later earned a Ducati ride. He led the 1998 standings until a crash at Phillip Island, but won the title in 1999. He also did an assortment of wild card rides in the Superbike World Championship rounds at Phillip Island over the years, as well as four 500cc Grand Prix races in 1999.

He spent the next 2 years with Carl Fogarty's Foggy Petronas team, which struggled to be competitive with its three-cylinder machine, although beating team-mates Garry McCoy and Craig Jones in those years. It soon became clear that this was not the case - he nearly lost the ride after 2 races, but continued for rounds 3 and 4, before leaving the team as it could not provide a full-time entry. He moved into the World Supersport Championship at Assen, replacing injured countryman Kevin Curtain Later in  he contested the Suzuka 8 Hours race, and he made World Superbike starts on Yamaha and Suzuki equipment, but finished the season with a broken metatarsal.

In 2008 he retired from World Superbike racing but joined the World Superbike Championship as a commentator alongside Jonathan Green. He continued to race a Superbike and finished 1st in the World Endurance Championship for YART (Yamaha Austria Racing Team).  BMW also retained his services as a development rider for their new S1000RR Superbike project, which led to a one-off return at Kyalami in place of Troy Corser.

Career statistics

Superbike World Championship

Races by year
(key) (Races in bold indicate pole position) (Races in italics indicate fastest lap)

Grand Prix motorcycle racing

Races by year
(key) (Races in bold indicate pole position, races in italics indicate fastest lap)

Supersport World Championship

Races by year
(key) (Races in bold indicate pole position) (Races in italics indicate fastest lap)

References

Superbike World Championship riders
Australian motorcycle racers
500cc World Championship riders
Living people
1968 births
Supersport World Championship riders